Scott Burgess may refer to:

 Scott Burgess (sound designer), American audio engineer, composer, sound designer and performer
 Scott Burgess (actor) (1959–2016), Australian actor
 Scott Burgess (footballer) (born 1996), English footballer